The 2019 CS Lombardia Trophy was held in September 2019 in Bergamo, Italy. It was part of the 2019–20 ISU Challenger Series. Medals were awarded in the disciplines of men's singles, ladies' singles, and ice dance.

Entries
The International Skating Union published the list of entries on August 19, 2019.

Changes to preliminary assignments

Results

Men

Ladies

Ice dance

References

External links
 2019 CS Lombardia Trophy at the International Skating Union

Lombardia Trophy
Lombardia Trophy
Lombardia Trophy